Rutgers University is home to chapters of many Greek organizations; however, only a small percentage of the undergraduate student body is active in Greek life.  Several fraternities and sororities maintain houses for their chapters in the area of Union Street (known as "Frat Row") in New Brunswick within blocks of Rutgers' College Avenue Campus.

In 1845, Delta Phi became the first fraternity to organize on the campus.  Zeta Psi was the second fraternity and was organized in 1845 as well. Delta Upsilon was the third fraternity to establish itself on the campus in 1858; the first non-secret fraternity in New Brunswick. The Alpha Rho chapter of Chi Psi fraternity, founded at Rutgers College in 1879, was the first fraternity at Rutgers to own a fraternity house, or "Lodge", purchased in 1887. The fraternity today still owns and occupies the same property at 114 College Avenue. Presently, there are over fifty fraternities and sororities on the New Brunswick-Piscataway campus, ranging from traditional to historically African-American, Latino, Multicultural and Asian-interest organizations. Greek organizations are governed by the Office of Fraternity and Sorority Affairs. Twelve organizations currently maintain chapters in New Brunswick without sanction by the University's administration.

Fraternities

Sororities

Professional and Special Interest Chapters
 Alpha Kappa Psi co-ed professional business fraternity
 Alpha Nu Omega Christian fraternity and sorority
 Alpha Phi Omega co-ed service fraternity
 Alpha Zeta co-ed honor/service fraternity for students at Land Grant Institutions
 Alpha Zeta Omega co-ed professional pharmaceutical fraternity
 Delta Sigma Pi co-ed professional business fraternity
 Lambda Kappa Sigma professional pharmacy sorority
 Mu Beta Psi co-ed music fraternity
 Phi Alpha Delta pre-law fraternity
 Phi Chi Theta co-ed professional business fraternity
 Phi Delta Chi co-ed professional pharmacy fraternity
 Phi Delta Epsilon co-ed pre-medical fraternity
 Phi Sigma Pi co-ed honor fraternity
 Phi Sigma Rho engineering sorority
 Theta Tau professional engineering fraternity

References

External links
 Rutgers University
 Office of Fraternity and Sorority Affairs

Greek organizations, Rutgers University
Lists of chapters of United States student societies by college